Gabriel Jaime Alejandro Vargas Díaz (born 15 September 2000), often also referred to as Gabriel 'Toretico' Vargas is a venezuelan footballer who plays as a left winger for Venezuelan Primera División club Carabobo.

Career

Club career
Until Vargas was 13 years old, he was playing baseball, beside football. He is a product of Carabobo, where he went through the youth ranks of the club, all the way up to the first team, where he made his debut in a Venezuelan Primera División against Zulia FC on 23 February 2018. His first professional goal came on 26 March 2018 against Estudiantes de Mérida. He made 11 appearances in the 2018 season.

In the 2019 season, Vargas moved to Monagas, while he played for Gran Valencia in 2020. In 2021, he signed for Mineros de Guayana.

On 10 January 2022, Vargas returned to Carabobo on a deal until the end of 2023.

References

External links
 

Living people
2000 births
Association football wingers
Venezuelan footballers
Venezuelan Primera División players
Carabobo F.C. players
Monagas S.C. players
A.C.C.D. Mineros de Guayana players
Footballers from Caracas